Xavier García Gadea (born 5 January 1984) is a Spanish-Croatian water polo player. He was a member of the Spain national team between 1999 and 2013, finishing in sixth place at the 2004 Summer Olympics in Athens, fifth at the 2008 Summer Olympics in Beijing and sixth again at the 2012 Summer Olympics in London. In 2003, García, then playing for CN Barcelona-Noferthe, ended up in fifth place with the national side at the 2003 World Aquatics Championships in his home town of Barcelona.

Since 2010, García has played in Croatia. After being left out of the Spain national team in 2013, he obtained the Croatian citizenship in 2016 to be able to take part in the Rio Olympics, facing Spain in the group stage.

Honours
CN Barcelona
 LEN Euro Cup: 2003–04

Spanish Championship: 2003–04, 2004–05
Copa del Rey: 2002–03
CN Atlètic-Barceloneta
Spanish Championship: 2006–07, 2008–09, 2009–10 
Copa del Rey: 2006–07, 2008–09, 2009–10 
Supercopa de España: 2007, 2009, 2010
Primorje Rijeka
LEN Champions League runners-up: 2011–12, 2014–15
Adriatic League: 2012–13, 2013–14, 2014–15
Croatian Championship: 2013–14, 2014–15
Croatian Cup: 2012–13, 2013–14, 2014–15
VK Jug
LEN Champions League: 2015–16 ; runners-up: 2016–17
LEN Super Cup: 2016
Adriatic League: 2015–16, 2016–17, 2017–18 
Croatian Chanmpionship: 2015–16, 2016–17, 2017–18, 2018–19, 2019–20  
Croatian Cup: 2015–16, 2016–17, 2017–18, 2018–19

Awards
 Member of the World Team 2018 by total-waterpolo

Orders
Order of Danica Hrvatska with face of Franjo Bučar – 2016

See also
 Croatia men's Olympic water polo team records and statistics
 List of Olympic medalists in water polo (men)
 List of players who have appeared in multiple men's Olympic water polo tournaments
 List of world champions in men's water polo
 List of World Aquatics Championships medalists in water polo

References

External links
 

1984 births
Living people
Water polo players from Barcelona
Spanish emigrants to Croatia
Spanish male water polo players
Croatian male water polo players
Water polo drivers
Left-handed water polo players
Water polo players at the 2004 Summer Olympics
Water polo players at the 2008 Summer Olympics
Water polo players at the 2012 Summer Olympics
Water polo players at the 2016 Summer Olympics
Water polo players at the 2020 Summer Olympics
Medalists at the 2016 Summer Olympics
Olympic water polo players of Spain
Olympic silver medalists for Croatia in water polo
World Aquatics Championships medalists in water polo
Competitors at the 2005 Mediterranean Games
Competitors at the 2013 Mediterranean Games
Mediterranean Games medalists in water polo
Mediterranean Games gold medalists for Spain
Mediterranean Games silver medalists for Spain
Croatian people of Spanish descent
Croatian people of Catalan descent
Naturalized citizens of Croatia
Sportsmen from Catalonia
Spanish expatriate sportspeople in Croatia
Expatriate water polo players
Naturalised sports competitors